Davis Bluff is a rock bluff that rises to 400 m in height. Davis Bluff was named by the United States Board of Geographic names following the recommendation of its Advisory Committee on Antarctic Names in 2005 after Randall William Davis, Department of Marine Biology, Texas A&M University, Galveston, Texas. Dr. Davis studied the Weddell seal in McMurdo Sound sea ice areas from 1977 to 2003, including winter season research at White Island with his wife Ana Maria Davis, Michael A. Castellini and Markus Horning.

References

Ross Archipelago